Piripi Te Maari-o-te-rangi (1837?–1895) was a notable New Zealand tribal leader, farmer, protester and orator. Of Māori descent, he identified with the Ngāti Kahungunu and Rākaiwhakairi iwi. He was born in Waimārama, Hawke's Bay, New Zealand, in about 1837.

References

1837 births
1895 deaths
New Zealand activists
New Zealand Māori activists
Ngāti Kahungunu people
People from Waimārama